Matthew "McCall" Freeman (born Roger Matthew Freeman; April 23, 1966) is an American musician, singer and songwriter. He is best known for his bass work with the punk rock bands Operation Ivy, Rancid and as the frontman of Devil's Brigade.

Playing style 
In an interview streamed from the Rancid website before the release of Rancid (2000), he revealed that his style was heavily influenced at an early age by John Entwistle, bassist for The Who. He plays both with a pick and fingerstyle.

Freeman's playing style is considered atypical in the punk rock world due to his frequent use of scales and arpeggios as opposed to "motoring" through a chord progression's root notes as is typical of punk bass playing.

Singing style 
Although Armstrong and Frederiksen are the principal singers in Rancid, Freeman has taken the lead vocal duties in a number of gritty sounding songs through the years, including the songs "Black and Blue", "Rigged on a Fix", "Black Derby Jacket", "Tenderloin" and, "L.A. River".  He is known for possessing a deep and raspy singing voice. Freeman was also the primary co-lead vocal for the first Rancid album, before Frederiksen joined the band, with his role subsequently being reduced by choice.

Gear 
Freeman plays Fender Precision and Jazz Basses. His 1977 Fender Precision was used as the basis for the 2011 Squier Matt Freeman Signature Bass.

He has also played Music Man Stingrays, Ibanez ATK's and Rickenbacker 4003's in the past.

Bands

Operation Ivy and Downfall 
In May 1987, Freeman and Armstrong formed the band Operation Ivy.  After Operation Ivy broke up in May 1989, they formed a new band, Downfall, which included all but one member of Operation Ivy and two additional members.  Downfall recorded a 10-song album which has never been released, then broke up. Freeman and Armstrong next formed Generator, who played a number of shows, but are not known to have recorded anything. After that, Freeman played with the political punk band MDC for about a year.

Dance Hall Crashers 
After Operation Ivy, Freeman and Armstrong formed the ska band the Dance Hall Crashers, however they left the band shortly after its formation.  The band went on to become moderately successful throughout the 90s.

MDC 
He joined MDC in 1990, completing one US and one European tour and playing bass on their 1991 release Millions Of Dead Cops II: Hey Cop! If I Had A Face Like Yours.... The lineup for this version of the band consisted of Freeman, original singer Dave Dictor, original drummer Al Schvitz and guitarist Bill Collins, formerly of Fang, Special Forces and Intensified Chaos.

Gr'ups and Rancid 
He joined The Gr'ups in 1991. In 1992, Freeman and Armstrong recruited drummer Brett Reed and formed Rancid. Rancid is his most successful band yet. He considered Rancid a side project until Armstrong had proved to him that he had his alcoholism under control. Guitarist Lars Frederiksen joined the band later in 1993. Their partnership has continued with Freeman contributing basslines to selected tracks by the Transplants, one of Armstrong's side projects.

Social Distortion 
During Rancid's 2004 hiatus, Freeman replaced bassist John Maurer in Social Distortion shortly before the release of their then-new album Sex, Love and Rock 'n' Roll. Freeman did not intend to stay in the band permanently and he was replaced by current bassist Brent Harding in late 2004.

Charger
In 2020 Matt formed a heavy metal band, Charger.

The Crew 

In May 2021, Freeman along with fellow Rancid bandmate Tim Armstrong, Fletcher Dragge (Pennywise), Byron McCracken (Pennywise), and Mike Muir (Suicidal Tendencies) formed a punk rock supergroup called The Crew. The band's first single, "One Voice", was released on Epitaph Records.

Health issues 
Following his departure from Social Distortion, Freeman was diagnosed with lung cancer in May 2005, but was dismissed as abnormal tissue growth and not terminal to his health in June 2005. He had been a smoker for 20 years but had quit, seemingly by coincidence, shortly prior to this. He learned to play the mandolin so he would have something to do with his hands as heard on the Lars Frederiksen and the Bastards album Viking.

Discography

Operation Ivy 
 Turn it Around compilation (1987)
 Hectic EP (1988)
 Energy (1989)

Downfall 
 They Don't Get Paid, They Don't Get Laid, But Boy Do They Work Hard! compilation album (1989)
 Very Small World compilation album (1991)
 Can of Pork compilation album (1992)
 Later That Same Year – "My City"

MDC 
 Millions of Dead Cops II (1991)

Rancid 
 Rancid (1992)
 Rancid (1993)
 Radio Radio Radio (1993)
 Let's Go (1994)
 ...And Out Come the Wolves (1995)
 Life Won't Wait (1998)
 Rancid (2000)
 BYO Split Series Volume III (2002)
 Indestructible (2003)
 B Sides and C Sides  (2008)
 Let the Dominoes Fall (2009)
 Honor Is All We Know (2014)
 Trouble Maker (2017)

The Gr'ups 
 The Gr'ups (1992)
 Vinyl Retentive compilation album (1993)

Auntie Christ 
 Life Could Be a Dream (1997)

Devils Brigade 
 "Stalingrad" / "Psychos All Around Me" 12" single (2003)
 "Vampire Girl" 12" ep (2005)
 Devils Brigade (2010)

References

External links 
Room Thirteen interview – August 2010

1966 births
Living people
American male singers
American punk rock bass guitarists
American male bass guitarists
American rock singers
Singers from California
Place of birth missing (living people)
Rancid (band) members
Social Distortion members
Operation Ivy (band) members
Guitarists from California
20th-century American bass guitarists
Downfall (band) members
Transplants (band) members
Devils Brigade (band) members
Shaken 69 members
Dance Hall Crashers members